This is a list of Estonian football transfers in the summer transfer window 2019 by club. Only transfers related to Meistriliiga clubs are included.

This transfer window was open from 1 July to 31 July.

Meistriliiga

Nõmme Kalju

In: 

Out:

FCI Levadia

In: 

Out:

Flora Tallinn

In: 

Out:

Narva Trans

In: 

Out:

Paide Linnameeskond

In: 

Out:

Tartu Tammeka

In: 

Out:

Viljandi Tulevik

In: 

Out:

Tallinna Kalev

In: 

Out:

Kuressaare

In: 

Out:

Maardu Linnameeskond

In: 

Out:

References

External links
 Official site of the Estonian Football Association
 Official site of the Meistriliiga

Estonian
transfers
2019